The Kastav Statute is a 14th-century Glagolitic city statute of Croatian city Kastav. 

The Kastav Statute "Zakon Grada Kastva od letta 1400", was written in 1400, in Istria, near Rijeka in Croatia. Some sources claims that it was written in 1490, but it was probably translated from Glagolitic Script into Latin then, since it is preserved in Latin. 

The Kastav Statute confirms status of Kastav, as an administrative and political centre from the late 14th century.

See also
Glagolitic alphabet
Vrbnik Statute
Moscenica Statute
Veprinac Statute

References

Croatian language
14th-century books
14th century in Croatia
History of Dalmatia
Legal history of Croatia
1400s in law
Croatian glagolithic texts
1400 in Europe